The flora of Romania comprises around 3,450 species of vascular plants, which represents around 30% of the vascular flora of Europe.

The three major vegetation zones in Romania are the alpine, steppe, and forest zones. The latter can be subdivided (depending on soil, climate, and altitude) into regions dominated by the Norway Spruce, European Beech, and various species of Oak, together with less widespread vegetation types such as the Dinaric calcareous block fir forest.

The Danube Delta is the largest continuous marshland in Europe. Vegetation in the marshland is dominated by reeds, with Willow, Poplar, Alder, and Oak on the higher ground. In 1991, this area became part of the UNESCO list of World Heritage Sites. The delta supports 1,688 different plant species.

The meadow-steppe grassland areas of Romania are also species-rich, but endangered.

Among the flora of Romania are medicinal plants such as Arnica montana, Primula veris, Tussilago farfara, and Atropa belladonna.

All the genera and species of plants found in Romania are listed in the 1977 work The Flora of Romania Illustrated Determinator of Vascular Plants.

Kingdom Plantae

Division Pteridophyta

Class Lycopsida

Class Sphenopsida

Class Filicopsida

X = hybrid

? = Species which were no longer found in 1977.

Division Spermatophyta

Subdivision Gymnospermae

Subdivision Angiospermae

Class Dicotyledoneae

Orders 1-25

Orders 26-33

Class Monocotyledonatae

See also
 List of plants from the mountains of Romania
 List of Dacian plant names

Notes

References

External links